British College is a Chilean high school located in San Fernando, Colchagua Province, Chile.

References 

Educational institutions with year of establishment missing
Secondary schools in Chile
Schools in Colchagua Province

Private schools in Chile
International schools in Chile
English-language schools